Christ Is My Hope is the third EP by the American alternative rock band the Innocence Mission.

A collection of newly recorded spiritual music ("O Lord of Light", "O Sacred Head Surrounded", "Beautiful Saviour"), folk songs ("500 Miles"), ballads ("Fare Thee Well"), and original songs ("No Storms Come", "Christ Is My Hope", "Morning Star"), the record was released independently by the group's own label, LAMP, with all proceeds donated to hunger relief charities.

The lyrics to "No Storms Come" are adapted from the poem "Heaven-Haven (A Nun Takes the Veil)" by 19th-century English poet Gerard Manley Hopkins. It was re-released on their album Befriended (2003).

Track listing

References

Christ is My Hope
The Innocence Mission albums